Lieutenant-General James Hamilton, 4th Duke of Hamilton and 1st Duke of Brandon, KG, KT (11 April 1658 – 15 November 1712) was a Scottish nobleman, soldier and politician. Hamilton was a major investor in the failed Darien Scheme, which cost many of Scotland's ruling class their fortunes. He led the Country Party in the Parliament of Scotland and the opposition to the Act of Union in 1707. He died on 15 November 1712 as the result of a celebrated duel in Hyde Park, Westminster, with Charles Mohun, 4th Baron Mohun, over a disputed inheritance.

Early life

The eldest son of William Douglas, 1st Earl of Selkirk (who was created Duke of Hamilton for his lifetime and changed his surname to Hamilton in 1660) and his wife Anne, 3rd Duchess of Hamilton in her own right, Hamilton was born at Hamilton Palace, in Lanarkshire. He was a descendant through his mother of the Scottish House of Stewart and therefore had a significant claim to the thrones of both Scotland and England. He was educated by a series of tutors, until he was of age to attend the University of Glasgow. Following this, he travelled to the continent on the Grand Tour, fashionable amongst young noblemen of the time. He was styled until 1698 as the Earl of Arran.

In 1679, Arran was appointed a Gentleman of the Bedchamber by Charles II. Later in 1683, he was accredited ambassador to the Court of Louis XIV of France. Arran remained in France for over a year, taking part in two campaigns in French service. On his return to Great Britain following the accession of James VII and II, he brought letters of personal recommendation from Louis to the new King. King James reaffirmed Arran in his offices. Arran was in the first cohort of James VII's royal Order of the Thistle in 1687, and following the deposition of James, Arran refused to join the party of the Prince of Orange, indeed he was imprisoned twice in the Tower of London, suspected of intrigues, but was released without charge.

Duke of Hamilton
Arran's father died in 1694, and in July 1698 his mother resigned all her titles into the hand of King William, who regranted them to Arran a month later in a charter signed at Het Loo, Netherlands. He was confirmed in the titles of Duke of Hamilton, Marquess of Clydesdale, Earl of Arran, Lanark and Cambridge and Lord Aven, Polmont, Machansyre, and Innerdale. This regrant of title was presumably because of the loyalty of Arran's parents to the king, as his own affection to the House of Orange was questionable due to his suspected Jacobitism. (He was arrested more than once for pro-Stuart activities.)

The Darien scheme and the Act of Union
Hamilton formed a Political grouping in support of the Darien Scheme, in the Parliament of Scotland.  He and his mother had heavily invested in the expedition, that ultimately failed resulting in Scotland losing 20% of its currency in circulation at the time.

Following the failure of Darien, and in light of the longer history of trade friction with England, serious machinations began proposing a union between the two realms of Scotland and England. Hamilton was assumed to be the head of the anti-union Cavalier Party, perhaps due to his serious claim to the throne of Scotland. Hamilton, being a descendant through his mother of the Scottish House of Stewart (prior to their accession to the English throne) was the senior-most claimant to the throne of Scotland in the event that Scotland chose not to accept Sophia of the Palatinate as the Stuart heiress (see Act of Security 1704). Sophia was the most junior descendant of the most junior branch of the English Stuarts and Scotland, also being Protestant, would only accept a Protestant heir to Scotland. This meant that Hamilton and his heirs were next in the Scottish line of succession after the House of Hanover. To the detriment of his royal future, Hamilton's political conduct proved ineffective and he wavered between both the Court and the National parties. On the day of the final vote regarding the Anglo-Scottish union, Hamilton abstained and remained in his chambers at Holyrood Palace claiming to be indisposed by toothache. The highly unpopular Acts of Union were passed, and riots followed in the streets of Edinburgh. Hamilton had missed his chance to secure the Scottish succession for his family.

Post Union
Hamilton was chosen as one of 16 Scottish Representative Peers in 1708. He was created  Duke of Brandon, Suffolk in the Peerage of Great Britain in 1711. This drew criticism as to the legality of his position and ability to sit in the House of Lords. The situation was not resolved until 1782 for the 6th Duke of Hamilton. In addition to the Dukedom, Hamilton was created Baron Dutton in Cheshire. In October 1712 he was created a Knight of the Garter, making him the only Non-Royal to be a knight of both Thistle and Garter.

The Macclesfield inheritance and death

On 15 November 1712, Hamilton fought a celebrated duel with Charles, Lord Mohun, in Hyde Park, Westminster, in an episode narrated in Thackeray's The History of Henry Esmond.
Following the death without an heir of Fitton Gerard, third Earl of Macclesfield, in 1702, a disagreement had arisen over who should succeed to his extensive estates, based at Gawsworth Hall, Cheshire. Hamilton claimed the estates through his wife Elizabeth Gerard, a granddaughter of Charles Gerard, 1st Earl of Macclesfield. Mohun claimed them as the named heir of Charles Gerard, 2nd Earl of Macclesfield, to whom he had been a companion-in-arms. The years of litigation that followed culminated in Mohun calling Hamilton out.

The duel took place on the morning of the 15th. The older Hamilton mortally wounded Mohun, and was mortally wounded in turn.  Hamilton's second thereafter claimed that Mohun's second George Macartney had dealt the final stroke to Hamilton whilst pretending to attend to Mohun, but the evidence was wholly inconclusive.  Questions about why John Hamilton did not stay to attempt to arrest Macartney if he had thought that such a crime had been committed brought suspicion on his testimony.  A cry for justice went up amongst the Duke's friends, including Jonathan Swift, and Macartney escaped to the continent. After attempts to repatriate him, he was tried in absentia for murder, and stripped of his regiment, but was later pardoned.

Marriage and issue
In 1686 Hamilton married Lady Anne Spencer, a daughter of Robert Spencer, 2nd Earl of Sunderland. They had two daughters, although neither survived childhood:

Unnamed daughter (born and died 1689)
Unnamed daughter (born and died 1690)

Anne died shortly after the birth of the second daughter in 1690.

Hamilton married secondly Elizabeth Gerard, daughter of Digby Gerard, 5th Baron Gerard in 1698 (died February 1743/4), and had seven children:

Lady Elizabeth Hamilton (1699–1702)
Lady Catherine Hamilton (c. 1700 – 22 Dec 1712)
Lady Charlotte Hamilton (c. 1701 – 1774), who married Charles Edwin, MP, of Llanfihangel, and was a figure in early Methodism.
James Hamilton, 5th Duke of Hamilton (1703–1743)
Lord William Hamilton (c. 1705 – 1734)
Lady Susan Hamilton (26 Sep 1706–1753), who married Anthony Keck, MP for Woodstock.
Lord Anne Hamilton (1709–1748), ancestor of the 13th and subsequent Dukes of Hamilton.

In addition, Hamilton had four illegitimate children:

Lt. Col. Sir James Abercrombie, 1st Baronet, born prior to 1680, who died at Dunkirk in 1724. Sir James entered the Royal Scots, rose to the rank of lieutenant colonel and fought in the Battle of Blenheim as aide-de-camp to his uncle George Douglas-Hamilton, 1st Earl of Orkney. He went on to become a Whig MP for Dysart Burghs in 1710.
Sir Charles Hamilton KB, born to Lady Barbara FitzRoy, he married first Elizabeth, daughter of the Hon. John Campbell of Mamore and had a son christened William James (the surname was taken after his grandfather), but he died in infancy. The main reason for the name change was to distance him from the Hamilton family who had sent Charles out to France after the disgrace of his father's affair and bastard child. While in France Charles Hamilton was styled Count of Arran. Elizabeth later died and Charles remarried Antoinette Courtney, daughter of Charles Courtney of Archambaud and had a son by her, Charles Hamilton James (christened with the surname James as with his older brother) who returned to England and began a military career, finally settling in Dorset. Charles on returning to England went into the Army, became a Lieutenant Colonel in the Royal Scots Greys and was created a Knight Companion of the Order of the Bath. He went on to marry Catherine, daughter of Sir Gerrard Napier, 5th Baronet of Middle March and had a son, who married firstly the granddaughter of the 3rd Earl of Aboyne and secondly the daughter of John Montagu, 5th Earl of Sandwich he had issue by both.
Hamilton also had two daughters named Ruthven.

Ancestors

Coat of Arms

Notes

References

Further reading

|-

|-

1658 births
1712 deaths
Diplomatic peers
Duelling fatalities
Peers of Great Britain created by Queen Anne
101
104
Garter Knights appointed by Anne
Knights of the Thistle
Lord-Lieutenants of Lancashire
Members of the Parliament of Scotland 1689–1702
Members of the Parliament of Scotland 1702–1707
Royal Horse Guards officers
Scottish generals
Scottish representative peers
James Hamilton, 4th Duke of Hamilton
Ambassadors of Great Britain to France
James
Scottish Jacobites